John A. Field Jr. (March 22, 1910 – December 16, 1995) was a United States circuit judge of the United States Court of Appeals for the Fourth Circuit and previously was a United States district judge of the United States District Court for the Southern District of West Virginia.

Education and career

Born in Charleston, West Virginia, Field received an Artium Baccalaureus degree from Hampden–Sydney College in 1932 and a Bachelor of Laws from the University of Virginia School of Law in 1935. He was in private practice in Charleston from 1935 to 1943. He was in the United States Navy during World War II, from 1944 to 1946. He returned to private practice in Charleston from 1947 to 1957, and was member of the Charleston City Council from 1947 to 1951, and president of that body from 1951 to 1955. He unsuccessfully ran as a Republican candidate for West Virginia state attorney general in 1956, but was instead appointed state tax commissioner from 1957 to 1959.

Federal judicial service

On May 11, 1959, Field was nominated by President Dwight D. Eisenhower to a seat on the United States District Court for the Southern District of West Virginia vacated by Judge Ben Moore. He was confirmed by the United States Senate on August 12, 1959, and received his commission the following day. He served as Chief Judge from 1959 to 1971. His service terminated on October 7, 1971, due to his elevation to the Fourth Circuit.

On September 8, 1971, Field was nominated by President Richard Nixon to a seat on the United States Court of Appeals for the Fourth Circuit vacated by Judge Herbert Stephenson Boreman. He was confirmed by the Senate on September 21, 1971, and received his commission on September 22, 1971. He assumed senior status on April 1, 1976. He served as a Judge of the United States Foreign Intelligence Surveillance Court of Review from May 19, 1982, to May 18, 1989. His service terminated on December 16, 1995, due to his death in Naples, Florida.

References

Sources
 

1910 births
1995 deaths
20th-century American judges
20th-century American lawyers
United States Navy personnel of World War II
Hampden–Sydney College alumni
Judges of the United States Court of Appeals for the Fourth Circuit
Judges of the United States District Court for the Southern District of West Virginia
Military personnel from Charleston, West Virginia
Lawyers from Charleston, West Virginia
Tax commissioners
United States court of appeals judges appointed by Richard Nixon
United States district court judges appointed by Dwight D. Eisenhower
University of Virginia School of Law alumni
West Virginia city council members
West Virginia lawyers
West Virginia Republicans